Deniz Ertan (born January 1, 2004) is a Turkish swimmer specialized in freestyle swimming. She qualified for the 800m freestyle event of the 2020 Summer Olympics. She is a member of Fenerbahçe Swimming

While living in Ankara, Turkey, Ertan attended TED Ankara College. She won the bronze medal in the 200m individual medley event at the 2019 European Youth Summer Olympic Festival in Baku, Azerbaijan. Her collegiate swimming career began in 2022 at Georgia Tech, swimming under head coach Courtney Shealy Hart.

References

2004 births
Living people
Sportspeople from Ankara
Turkish female freestyle swimmers
Fenerbahçe swimmers
Swimmers at the 2020 Summer Olympics
Olympic swimmers of Turkey
21st-century Turkish sportswomen
Swimmers at the 2022 Mediterranean Games
Mediterranean Games medalists in swimming
Mediterranean Games gold medalists for Turkey
Mediterranean Games silver medalists for Turkey
Mediterranean Games bronze medalists for Turkey
Islamic Solidarity Games competitors for Turkey
Islamic Solidarity Games medalists in swimming